Andrei Popov (born 24 January 1973) is a Moldovan diplomat, journalist and civic activist.

Biography 

Andrei Popov is a Moldovan career diplomat, political analyst and journalist, President of the Moldovan Institute for Strategic Initiatives (IPIS). He is the author of the weekly TV programme "Popular Diplomacy” and co-host of the weekly political talk-show „Botan+Popov”, both on independent TV8 channel.

He is the former Member of the Parliament (2009), Deputy Minister of Foreign Affairs and European Integration (2009-2013) and Ambassador of Moldova to Austria, Slovakia, OSCE and International organisations in Vienna (2013-2016). In the later capacity, in April–August 2014, he served as the Chairperson of the OSCE's Forum for Security Cooperation (FSC). In 2016, in the middle of his ambassadorial mandate, he resigned from the diplomatic service in sign of disagreement with the policies of the ruling Democratic Party's leadership.

In 2004–2009, Popov was the executive director of the Foreign Policy Association of Moldova (APE) and founder of the Transnistrian Dialogues program. From 1997 to 2004, he served in different capacities in Moldovan diplomatic service: first in the Embassy of Moldova in Washington (1997-2001) as Second/First Secretary, then in the Foreign Ministry's General International Security Department (2001-2004) as its Deputy Director/Director.

He started his career in 1996 as Press and Information officer at the United Nations Development Program in Moldova.

Education and awards
Popov studied at the Geneva Centre for Security Policy (2002-2003), Faculty of International Relations of the Bucharest National School of Political and Administrative Studies (1994-1996) and Faculty of Journalism and Communication Studies of the Bucharest University (1990-1994).

In 2014 Popov was awarded the diplomatic rank of Ambassador Extraordinary and Plenipotentiary. He is the Cavalier of the Order of the Officer's Cross of Merit of Hungary (2013), chairman of the Alumni association of the European Institute of Political Studies of Moldova (IESPM), Board member of the Association for Participative Democracy (ADEPT), alumni in the Young Munich Leaders Program (2011) and the graduate of the UK John Smith Fellowship Program (2009).

References

External links 
 Deputy Minister of Foreign Affairs and European Integration
 Site-ul Parlamentului Republicii Moldova
 Partidul Democrat din Moldova
 https://www.ipis.md/en/
 http://tv8.md/tv8-show-category/botanpopov/
 https://www.youtube.com/watch?v=QY0ZcCJYBI0&list=PL9uZo1mBZWs0Ld9x3Rib1KeqfTwxoVE8J

1971 births
Living people
Moldovan MPs 2009–2010
Democratic Party of Moldova MPs
University of Bucharest alumni